Fulgencio Coll Bucher (born July 18, 1948) is a Spanish general who served as Chief of Staff of the Army. Coll assumed the office on 18 July 2008, replacing Carlos Villar. Jaime Domínguez Buj replaced him on 27 July 2012.

He commanded the Armoured Division No. 1 "Brunete" from 2004.

On December 13, 2018, it was announced that he would be head of the conservative party Actúa-Vox coalition for the 2019 municipal elections in his hometown.

References

1948 births
Spanish generals
Living people
Recipients of the Order of Isabella the Catholic
Grand Crosses of the Royal and Military Order of San Hermenegild
Officiers of the Légion d'honneur
People from Palma de Mallorca
Spanish municipal councillors